Cañada Gobernadora is a tributary to San Juan Creek, about  long, in southern Orange County in the U.S. state of California. The stream receives some urban runoff from the residential communities higher in its watershed. The watershed includes several geologic formations, including the Tertiary Sespe Formation and Santiago Formation, and Holocene sedimentary and alluvial deposits embedded in its narrow floodplain. Cañada Gobernadora forms an unofficial dividing line for the lower portion of the San Juan watershed; most urban development is confined to west of the creek's valley, while agricultural and undeveloped lands lie to the east of the creek.

Historically, the Cañada Gobernadora valley was inhabited by the Acjachemen Native Americans who had two villages on the creek, Huumai, in the upper areas of the creek, and Piwiva, which was at the confluence with San Juan Creek. This latter village became a proposed site for Mission San Juan Capistrano before it was built in the city of the same name. The name of the creek means "Canyon of the Governor's Wife" in Spanish. A less commonly used name refers to greasewood, which was once abundant in the Cañada Gobernadora watershed. The upper watershed of the creek is now mostly occupied by suburban residential communities, and the middle and lower portions are given primarily to agriculture.

References

Orange County, California articles needing infoboxes
Rivers of Orange County, California
San Juan Creek
Rivers of Southern California